Citharomangelia galigensis is a species of sea snail, a marine gastropod mollusk in the family Mangeliidae.

Description
The length of the shell attains 14 mm, its diameter 4 mm.

The shell is similar to Citharomangelia africana (G. B. Sowerby III, 1903) but the penultimate whorl only contains 7 axial ribs. The spiral sculpture is even more ill-defined.

Distribution
This marine species occurs in the Persian Gulf off Galig Island.

References

 Melvill J.C. 1899. Notes on the Mollusca of the Arabian Sea, Persian Gulf and Gulf of Oman, mostly dredged by Mr F. W. Townsend, with descriptions of twenty-seven species. ; The Annals and Magazine of Natural History, vol. 4 , s. 7; London,  1899

External links
  Tucker, J.K. 2004 Catalog of recent and fossil turrids (Mollusca: Gastropoda). Zootaxa 682:1–1295.
 Kilburn R.N. 1992. Turridae (Mollusca: Gastropoda) of southern Africa and Mozambique. Part 6. Subfamily Mangeliinae, section 1. Annals of the Natal Museum, 33: 461–575
 

galigensis
Gastropods described in 1899